Philip Owen Yenson (March 1883 – 20 January 1944) was an English professional footballer who played as a centre forward and half back, best remembered for being a part of the Bolton Wanderers team which won the 1904 FA Cup. He spent the majority of his career in the Southern League, playing for Croydon Common, Queens Park Rangers and West Ham United.

Personal life 
Yenson's son Kenny was also a footballer.

Honours 
Bolton Wanderers
 FA Cup: 1903–04
Queens Park Rangers
Southern League First Division: 1907–08
Croydon Common
 Southern League Second Division: 1913–14

Career statistics

References

External links 

English footballers
Brentford F.C. wartime guest players
English Football League players
Association football forwards
Southern Football League players
Association football midfielders
Croydon Common F.C. players
People from Vale of White Horse (district)
1883 births
West Ham United F.C. players
Bolton Wanderers F.C. players
Queens Park Rangers F.C. players
Crystal Palace F.C. wartime guest players
Margate F.C. players
1944 deaths
FA Cup Final players